Briskebyen is a neighborhood of Hamar, Norway. Prior to 1946, it was in Vang.

References

Hamar